Repeat Shoe is a 2022 Indian Tamil-language drama film directed by Kalyaan and starring Yogi Babu, Priya Kalyaan and Dileepan. It was released on 14 October 2022.

Cast
Yogi Babu as Maari
Priya Kalyaan as Priya
Dileepan as Dileepan
Redin Kingsley
KPY Bala
Anthony Daasan
Tony
George Vijay
Semmalar Annam

Production
During production, the film was titled as Shoe, before changing name prior to release.

Reception
The film was released on 14 October 2022 across Tamil Nadu. A critic from Dinamalar gave the film a mixed review, noting that it was "average". A reviewer from Maalai Malar gave the film a negative review, adding that "more effort was needed". A reviewer from Dina Thanthi also criticised the film.

References

External links

2022 films
2020s Tamil-language films